Christine Ann Fyffe (born 10 December 1944) is an Australian politician. She was a Liberal member of the Victorian Legislative Assembly from 1999 to 2002 and again from 2006 to 2018, representing Evelyn.

Personal life
Fyffe was born in Staffordshire, England, and was educated at Oldfield Hall Girls' School in the United Kingdom. She arrived in Australia in 1967, later creating with her recently married husband David, the Yarra Burn Winery and Restaurant at Yarra Junction.  She now has five children.  She supports the Essendon Football Club.

Political career
Fyffe was a vigneron before entering politics, and was appointed by the Kennett State Government as a Commissioner for the Yarra Ranges Shire for the period 1994–97. In 1999, she was selected as the Liberal candidate for Evelyn following the retirement of sitting member Jim Plowman.

In 2002, Fyffe was defeated by Labor candidate Heather McTaggart in the massive Labor landslide of that year.  At the following election in 2006, Fyffe again contested Evelyn and defeated McTaggart.

In 2010, Fyffe was elected Deputy Speaker of the Legislative Assembly, under Speaker Ken Smith. When Smith resigned as Speaker on 4 February 2014, the Assembly voted Fyffe in as his replacement.

In October 2016 it was announced that Fyffe would be retiring from her seat at the 2018 election.

References

External links
 Parliamentary voting record of Christine Fyffe at Victorian Parliament Tracker

1944 births
Living people
Members of the Victorian Legislative Assembly
Speakers of the Victorian Legislative Assembly
Liberal Party of Australia members of the Parliament of Victoria
English emigrants to Australia
People from Uttoxeter
21st-century Australian politicians
21st-century Australian women politicians
Women members of the Victorian Legislative Assembly